Peoria Koshiba (born June 27, 1979, in Ngerbeched, Koror) is a track and field sprint athlete who competes internationally for Palau.

Koshiba represented Palau at the 2008 Summer Olympics in Beijing. She competed in the 100 metres sprint and placed eighth in her heat with a time of 13.18 seconds,  not advancing to the second round. She is currently serving as a coach for young Palauans.

In February 2008, she was elected to the office of the Palau Track and Field Association and re-elected for the period 2012–2016.

Personal bests

Achievements

References

External links
 
Sports reference biography

1979 births
Living people
Palauan female sprinters
Olympic track and field athletes of Palau
Athletes (track and field) at the 2008 Summer Olympics
People from Koror
Olympic female sprinters